Derryvella, known as Daire Mór, is a medieval Christian monastery and National Monument located in County Tipperary, Ireland. Disambiguation Derryvella (Corlough) townland, County Cavan.

Location

History

This may be the same site as Daire Mór ("great oakwood"), founded by Colmán of Derrymore; although others claim that Daire Mór is actually the site at Longfordpass North, and that the site at Derryvella is Doire Meille, associated with Tigernach of Clones and reputedly the second-oldest churchyard in Ireland.

A monastery existed here from the mid-7th century AD.

Description

References

Christian monasteries in the Republic of Ireland
Religion in County Tipperary
Archaeological sites in County Tipperary
National Monuments in County Tipperary